Fernanda Andrea Ramírez Mellado (born 30 August 1992) is a Chilean footballer who plays as a defender for Colo-Colo and the Chile women's national team.

Early life 
Ramírez was raised in Santiago.

College career 
Ramírez played soccer in University of Cumberlands and Central Methodist University, both at NAIA level.

Club career 
Ramírez debuted for Audax Italiano in 2018. She played in Santiago Morning in 2019 and won the 2019 National Championship with "Chago".

Ramírez has played for Universidad de Chile since 2020. She scored her first goal against Universidad Católica in 2021 season.

On Jan 1, 2022, Colo-Colo announced that Ramirez will play for the club in 2022 season.

International career 
Ramírez was called to Chile's senior squad as a replacement for the injured Carla Guerrero on 29 November 2020. She was included in the 22-player squad for the Olympics Intercontinental Play-offs against Cameroon in Apr 2021.

Ramírez made her senior debut in a friendly against Slovakia on 10 Jun 2021. Chile lost the game 0-1.

References 

1992 births
Living people
Footballers from Santiago
Chilean women's footballers
Women's association football defenders
Cumberlands Patriots athletes
Central Methodist Eagles women's soccer players
Audax Italiano footballers
Santiago Morning (women) footballers
Universidad de Chile footballers
Chile women's international footballers
Chilean expatriate women's footballers
Chilean expatriate sportspeople in the United States
Expatriate women's soccer players in the United States
Footballers at the 2020 Summer Olympics
Olympic footballers of Chile